Herbert Eli "Herb" Scarf (July 25, 1930 – November 15, 2015) was an American mathematical economist and Sterling Professor of Economics at Yale University.

Education and career
Scarf was born in Philadelphia, the son of Jewish emigrants from Ukraine and Russia, Lene (Elkman) and Louis Scarf. During his undergraduate work he finished in the top 10 of the 1950 William Lowell Putnam Mathematical Competition, the major mathematics competition between universities across the United States and Canada.  He received his PhD from Princeton in 1954, supervised by Salomon Bochner.

Contributions
Among his notable works is a seminal paper in cooperative game in which he showed sufficiency for a core in general balanced games.  Sufficiency and necessity had been previously shown by Lloyd Shapley for games where players were allowed to transfer utility between themselves freely.  Necessity is shown to be lost in the generalization.

Recognition
Scarf received the 1973 Frederick W. Lanchester Award for his contribution The Computation of Economic Equilibria with the collaboration of Terje Hansen, which pioneered the use of numeric algorithms to solve general equilibrium systems using Applied general equilibrium models.
He was a member of the American Academy of Arts and Sciences, the National Academy of Sciences, and the American Philosophical Society, and was elected to the 2002 class of Fellows of the Institute for Operations Research and the Management Sciences.

References

External links
 Personal web site
 The works of Herbert Scarf

1930 births
2015 deaths
Members of the United States National Academy of Sciences
General equilibrium theorists
20th-century American economists
21st-century American economists
20th-century American mathematicians
Yale University faculty
Fellows of the Econometric Society
Presidents of the Econometric Society
Yale Sterling Professors
John von Neumann Theory Prize winners
Distinguished Fellows of the American Economic Association
Fellows of the American Academy of Arts and Sciences
Fellows of the Institute for Operations Research and the Management Sciences
21st-century American mathematicians
Members of the American Philosophical Society